Adoor Lok Sabha constituency was a Lok Sabha constituency in Kerala, dissolved in 2008. The seat was reserved for scheduled castes.

Assembly segments
Adoor Lok Sabha constituency was composed of the following assembly segments:
Konni
Pathanapuram
Punaloor
Chadayamangalam
Kottarakara
Neduvathur (SC)
Adoor

Members of Parliament 

2008 Onward : Constituency does not exist

See also
 Adoor
 List of former constituencies of the Lok Sabha

References

External links
 Election Commission of India: https://web.archive.org/web/20081218010942/http://www.eci.gov.in/StatisticalReports/ElectionStatistics.asp

Former Lok Sabha constituencies of Kerala
Former constituencies of the Lok Sabha
2008 disestablishments in India
Constituencies disestablished in 2008